Çərəcə (also, Charadzha, Chardzha, and Charedzha) is a village and municipality in the Goychay Rayon of Azerbaijan.  It has a population of 985. The municipality consists of the villages of Çərəcə and Çəyirli.

References 

Populated places in Goychay District